Lembit Kaljuvee (born 29 December 1952 in Raja) is an Estonian politician. He has been member of XI and XII Riigikogu.

He is a member of Estonian Centre Party.

References

Living people
1952 births
Estonian Centre Party politicians
Members of the Riigikogu, 2007–2011
Members of the Riigikogu, 2011–2015
Recipients of the Order of the National Coat of Arms, 3rd Class
Recipients of the Order of the National Coat of Arms, 4th Class
Tallinn University of Technology alumni
People from Mustvee Parish